Phil Harris (1904–1995) was an American singer, songwriter, jazz musician, actor, and comedian.

Phil Harris may also refer to:
 
 Phil Harris (fighter) (born 1984), English mixed martial artist
 Phil Harris (cricketer) (born 1990), English cricketer
 Phil Harris (fisherman) (1956–2010), American captain and part owner of the crab fishing vessel Cornelia Marie
 Phillip Harris (born 1989), English figure skater

See also 
 Philip Harris (disambiguation)
 Phil Harrison (disambiguation)